The Geometry C is a battery-powered compact crossover produced by Chinese auto manufacturer Geely under the Geometry brand.

Overview

The Geometry C is the second model of the Geometry brand. It was developed based on the Geely Emgrand GS, and comes in a choice of two battery capacities, a 53 kWh and a longer-range 70 kWh providing a NEDC range of  respectively, with the cells in both batteries coming from CATL. The electric motors were produced by Nidec and can produce up to 150 kW. The motors are called the Ni150Ex and will cover a power range from 50 kW to 200 kW.

The Geometry C became Israel's top-selling vehicle in August of 2022, marking the first time that an electric car held the top spot in total vehicle sales in the Israeli market.

Geometry G6
The Geometry M6 is the facelifted variant of the Geometry C launched in September 2022. The M6 features restyled front and rear end designs as well as the Harmony OS operating system by Huawei. The power comes from a 150kW electric motor with two variants offering a 450km and 580km electric range respectively.

On February 9, 2023, Geely Geometry C was introduced to the African market for the first time, and launched in the Egyptian market.

References

External links
 Geometry Official Website

Crossover sport utility vehicles
Hatchbacks
Front-wheel-drive vehicles
Compact sport utility vehicles
Cars introduced in 2019
2010s cars
Electric concept cars
Cars of China

Production electric cars